Jessica Rinaldi is a Pulitzer Prize winning photojournalist from the Boston Globe. She was awarded the Pulitzer prize in Feature Photography for her photographic story of a child living after abuse.

Early career
Rinaldi graduated from Boston University in 2001 with a B.S. in Journalism. For ten years she was a contract photographer for Reuters, winning multiple awards.

Pulitzer prize
Rinaldi's Pulitzer-winning submission was a photo-documentary of a seven-year-old named Strider Wolf. At two years old, Wolf was severely beaten by his parents, and underwent surgery for his damaged organs; the scar of which is visible in Rinaldi's work. The photos document Wolf living with his grandparents in rural Maine. When the story initially ran, a GoFundMe campaign was started, raising nearly $20,000 for Wolf and his caretakers. Rinaldi's other submission was a finalist for chronicling the life of heroin addicts in East Boston.

References 

Pulitzer Prize for Feature Photography winners
Year of birth missing (living people)
Living people